This is a list of bridges and tunnels on the National Register of Historic Places in the U.S. state of Massachusetts.

References

 
Bridges
Massachusetts
Bridges
Bridges